The 2014 Naiste Meistriliiga was the 22nd season of women's league football in Estonia.

The league was won by Pärnu JK, its 5th consecutive title and 10th overall. By winning, Pärnu qualified to 2015–16 UEFA Women's Champions League.

League clubs

The following clubs are competing in Naiste Meistriliiga during the 2015 season:

Format
The 6 teams played each other twice, for a total of ten matches. The top four teams qualified for the championship round, in which they played each other twice more, for a total of 16 matches.

League table

Regular season

Championship round

References

External links
Naised Expert Liga 2014 jalgpall.ee 
Meistrliiga Women (regular season) Soccrway

Estonia
Estonia
2014 in Estonian football
Naiste Meistriliiga